Bart Willoughby (born 12 September 1960) is an Indigenous Australian musician, noted for his pioneering fusion of reggae with Indigenous Australian musical influences, and for his contribution to growth of Indigenous music in Australia.

A Pitjantjatjara man of the Mirning dreaming, his totem is the whale. He is Kokatha through his father and Mirning through his mother. He grew up at Koonibba Aboriginal Mission near Ceduna on the South Australian edge of the Nullarbor Plain on the Great Australian Bight. At 14 years of age, after spending some time in a boys' facility, Willoughby found his way to the Centre for Aboriginal Studies in Music at the University of Adelaide, where he was introduced to music including drumming, singing and guitar playing.

Career

Bands
Willoughby's musical career commenced in 1978, and in this period he developed as a distinctive Indigenous Australian musician notable for his pioneering fusion of reggae music with Indigenous Australian influences. He formed his first band, also Australia's first Indigenous rock band, No Fixed Address, in 1978, though he also played with Jimmy Chi's newly formed band Kuckles throughout 1978 and 1979.

In 1979, No Fixed Address played its first large concert at the National Aboriginal Day event held in Taperoo, South Australia, and over the years has played at numerous concerts for Aboriginal causes, including Rock Against Racism, The Artists Newsletter Association, the Campaign Against Racial Exploitation and the National Aboriginal Country Music Festival.

At the end of 1981, No Fixed Address were the support band for Ian Dury and the Blockheads on their one and only Australia tour.

In 1982, Willoughby and his band toured Australia in support of Peter Tosh, and a documentary of this tour was screened by SBS TV entitled Peter Tosh in Concert, featuring Willoughby and No Fixed Address. During 1982, Willoughby also played drums with Shane Howard and Goanna. After the success of the Peter Tosh tour, Willoughby and his band became the first Aboriginal band to travel overseas, becoming cultural ambassadors for their people while touring Great Britain in 1984, playing at nine cities including London, Bristol, Leeds, Plymouth and Manchester. They played at "The Elephant Fayre" rock festival and appeared at a concert for striking miners. A documentary of this tour No Fixed Address in London was produced and screened on SBS TV.

Returning to Australia, Willoughby joined his cousin Bunna Lawrie, and his band Coloured Stone, founded in 1977. He played drums for them between 1985 and 1986, including on their Scottish tour where they appeared with k.d. lang at the 1986 Edinburgh Festival. Coloured Stone then returned to Australia, where Coloured Stone were awarded Best Indigenous Album at the 1986 Australian Music Awards for their debut album Human Love.

Willoughby reformed No Fixed Address in 1987, and in 1988, the band toured Europe, including Eastern Bloc countries where Willoughby made his wry comment about "being hungry in Hungary" while appearing at the 1987 East Berlin Music Festival.

Late in 1988, Willoughby was asked to join the newly formed Yothu Yindi as drummer on their Diesel & Dust tour, visiting 73 cities throughout the US on a tour that Willoughby found very strenuous. In 1989, Willoughby left Yothu Yindi to form a new band Mixed Relations, now known as Bart Willoughby Band, although he has reformed No Fixed Address on occasion. From its inception, Mixed Relations toured extensively throughout the Aboriginal communities, Australian cities, Pacific Islands, New Zealand and Hawaii, and were was chosen as the closing act for the 1989 inaugural Invasion (aka Survival) Day Concerts at La Perouse, Sydney and then every Invasion Day concert until its final date at La Perouse in 1994.

Following work in Alice Springs, Northern Territory and Surfers Paradise, Queensland on the film Until the end of the World, Willoughby was invited to tour Australia with Shane Howard and The Big Heart Band before returning to his work with Mixed Relations, opening the inaugural 1991 Stompen' Ground Concert in Broome, Western Australia and representing Australia at the 1990 and 1992 South Pacific Music Festival and the 1990 and 1992 Asian Music Festival. All of these festivals have been documented by ABC Television and SBS TV and screened by these stations in the year that the festivals were held and have had repeat screenings over the years.

In 1993, International Year of Indigenous People, Willoughby and Mixed Relations were invited to attend the Los Angeles Indigenous Arts Festival, the London Indigenous Festival, England and the Wanchai Music Festival, Hong Kong.

Film and television 

In 1980, Willoughby starred with another indigenous band Us Mob in non-indigenous director Ned Lander's movie about Aboriginal musicians Wrong Side of the Road. This film was a semi-biographical drama concerning the racism levelled against Aboriginal musicians trying to get gigs in country pubs and won the Australian Film Commission-funded Australian Film Institute's (AFI) 1981 Jury Award for its director Lander.

Interestingly it has been reported that during the 13 years that ABC Countdown ran from 1974 Bart Willoughby did not appear on the popular national TV show in spite of written requests to Molly Meldrum which remained unanswered.

After his 1988 European tour, Willoughby directed, composed and recorded the music track using his band for Always Was - Always Will Be, produced, directed and written by Indigenous filmmaker Madelaine McGrady and screened on SBS TV in the same year.

In 1989, Into the Mainstream (1989) directed by Ned Lander and covering the 1988 Yothu Yindi Diesel & Dust Tour screened on SBS-TV and also screened internationally through its distributor Ronin Films.

In 1990, Willoughby was cast as "Ned the Computer Expert" in German director Wim Wenders' Until the end of the World starring William Hurt, Sam Neill and Indigenous actor Ernie Dingo as well as Aboriginal icons actor David Gulpilil and Aboriginal Australia's first gold record singer and Yorta Yorta elder, Jimmy Little.

In 1992, Willoughby was invited by Australia's first Indigenous feature film director Brian Syron to become the first Aboriginal to compose, play and direct the music track of a feature film Jindalee Lady.  The film was invited to the International First Nations Art and Film Festival, "Dreamspeakers", in Edmonton, Canada in 1992 where it was acknowledge as the first feature film to be directed by a First Nation's director, Syron, and to have a music track composed and directed by a First Nations composer, Willoughby.

Following this festival, both Syron and Willoughby were invited to attend the 1992 Hawaii International Film Festival where Jindalee Lady was nominated for the East West Award - Best Feature Film and in 1993 Jindalee Lady was then invited to screen at the Tinker Theatre, Woodstock, New York as part of the Woodstock Tribute to the International Year of Indigenous People.

In 1994, Willoughby with his eldest son Woonun Willoughby appeared in the docudrama La Perouse for the Museum of Sydney & Historic Houses Trust of New South Wales directed by Michael Riley and narrated by Justine Saunders AM.

Willoughby has made many appearances on ABC Television, Channel 9, SBS TV, Channel 10 and Channel 7.

Teaching

During 1995 Willoughby took time out to work with his Pitjantjantjara community as Music Instructor to secondary school students at Yalata Anangu School, Yalata, South Australia where he taught drums, guitar and songwriting.

Awards

Willoughby received the 1993 Inaugural Indigenous ARIA Australian Music Lifetime Achievement Award for his Outstanding Contribution to Indigenous Music in Australia.  The award was presented by Will Smith and screened on Channel 10.  Sol Bellear, Commissioner of the Aboriginal Torres Strait Islander Commission (ATSIC – Acting) in presenting the award to Willoughby said : "Indigenous music has certainly come a long way in recent times. From 10 years ago out back of Australia, in outback hotels to internationally through Yothu Yindi, through Kev Carmody, through Archie Roach and many, many more. Let me tell you that the recipient of this very first Indigenous trophy has stood out clearly as an innovator for those people. He notched up a list of firsts that paved the way for a lot of Indigenous artists. He was the first to perform on Countdown, his was the first Aboriginal band to make a documentary, the first Aboriginal band to sign a record deal and the first, the very first, to tour overseas and Willoughby was the first, the very first to score, play and direct the music track of a feature film itself the first to be directed by an indigenous director. Bart's contribution to Aboriginal music in Australia is prodigious in book, film and record."  Bellear, Channel 10,  

In 1997 Willoughby was selected and represented at Nygaramang Bayumi an exhibition about Indigenous Australian music and Dance at the Powerhouse Museum, Darling Harbour, Sydney.

He was nominated for Best Indigenous Album at the 1998 APRA Music Awards for Pathways

In 2004, 2005, 2006 he was nominated for the Jimmy Little Lifetime Achievement Award at the Indigenous Deadly's for his contribution to Indigenous music in Australia.  Bart Willoughby is regarded as one of Australia's leading Aboriginal rock composers and performers and is widely known, loved and respected by Aboriginals for his work which includes Aboriginal classics such as "We Have Survived", "Aboriginal Woman" and "My Father is an Aboriginal Man".

Won
1986 Australian Music Award for Best Indigenous Album – Coloured Stone - "Human Love".
1993 Indigenous ARIA Australian Music Award Bart Willoughby for Outstanding Contribution to Indigenous Music in Australia.

Nominated
1998 APRA (Australian Performing Rights Association) Best Indigenous Album for Pathways.
2004, 2005, 2006The Deadly's - Jimmy Little Lifetime Achievement Award for Willoughby's contribution to Indigenous music in Australia.
2013 Melbourne Music Prize

Discography

Film soundtracks
Special Treatment - Locking up Aboriginal Children, Dir. Margaret Smith, Music Bart Willoughby – documentary
Always Was, Always Will Be, Producer Australian Broadcasting Commission ABC-TV, Music Bart Willoughby – documentary
Jindalee Lady (1992) Dir. Brian Syron, Music Bart Willoughby – feature film

Records / cassettes / CDs
Wrong Side of the Road, film sound track, EMI
Rock Against Racism, Vol. 1, Sound track from concert – ABC Records
National Aboriginal Music Festival, Soundtrack from concert – ABC Records
Stompem' Ground ABC Records
From My Eyes EMI
Take It or Leave It, Polygram
Aboriginal Woman. Polygram
Love', Polygram
Jindalee Lady, Donobri International
Pathways'' Polygram
Proud 
We Still Live On
Resonance

References

Bibliography
Media Ethics, An Aboriginal Film and the Australian Film Commission, Thomas G. Donovan / Brody T. Lorraine, 
Kicking Down the Doors, A History of Indigenous Filmmakers from 1968–1993, Brian Syron / briann kearney, 
Our Place, Our Music, ed. Marcus Breen, 
Bart Willoughby, Woonun Willoughby / Researchers briann kearney, Selwyn Burns  (2012)

External links
VIBE Australia biography

1960 births
Living people
Indigenous Australian musicians
Pitjantjatjara people
Musicians from South Australia
Reggae rock musicians